José de Jesús Godínez Navarro (born 20 January 1997) is a Mexican professional footballer who plays as a forward.

Club career
He arrived at Guadalajara at age 9 and has played for Chivas Fuerzas Básicas: U17, U18, and U20. He was a part of the winning U17 team for Liga MX Apertura 2013 and Clausura 2014, and top goalscorer of both tournaments. As well as winning the U20 Clausura 2016.
He made his professional debut under Argentine coach Matias Almeyda against Necaxa on 7 May 2017.

International career

Youth
Godínez was included in the under-21 roster that participated in the 2018 Toulon Tournament, where Mexico would finish runners-up.

Godínez was called up by Jaime Lozano to participate with the under-22 team at the 2019 Toulon Tournament, where Mexico won third place. He was called up by Lozano again to participate at the 2019 Pan American Games, with Mexico winning the third-place match.

Senior
Godínez made his senior national team debut on 2 October 2019 in a friendly against Trinidad & Tobago. He substituted the goalscorer José Juan Macías in the 74th minute.

Career statistics

Club

International

Honours
Guadalajara
Liga MX: Clausura 2017
CONCACAF Champions League: 2018

León
Liga MX: Guardianes 2020

Mexico U23
Pan American Bronze Medal: 2019

References

External links
 
 
 

1997 births
Living people
Footballers from Guadalajara, Jalisco
Association football forwards
Mexican footballers
Mexico international footballers
C.D. Guadalajara footballers
Club León footballers
Liga MX players
Pan American Games medalists in football
Pan American Games bronze medalists for Mexico
Footballers at the 2019 Pan American Games
Medalists at the 2019 Pan American Games